Závist may refer to:
 Závist (Blansko District)
 Závist (Zbraslav), a part of Prague's Zbraslav district on the right bank of the Vltava river
 , an oppidum south of Prague
 7440 Závist, a main belt asteroid